Qaleh Pain (also Romanized as Qal‘eh Pā’īn) is a village in Zirkuh Rural District, Bagh-e Bahadoran District, Lenjan County, Isfahan Province, Iran. At the 2006 census, its population was 288, in 80 families.

References 

Populated places in Lenjan County